Westerlo is a municipality located in the Belgian province of Antwerp. The municipality comprises seven towns:

 Westerlo centrum
 
 Tongerlo
 Heultje
 Voortkapel
 Oosterwijk
 

In 2021, Westerlo had a total population of 25,288. The total area is 55.13 km².

Places of interest

Castle of Westerlo has been in the possession of the House of Merode uninterruptedly since the late 15th century. It has served as the most important country estate of the senior branch since the 16th century. In 1910-12 Countess Jeanne de Merode built a new neogothic castle for herself which serves as the town hall of Westerlo since the 1970s.
Tongerlo Abbey contains a very old and fine copy of Leonardo da Vinci's The Last Supper. It is also known as home of the Tongerlo Abbey beer, but this is no longer brewed at the abbey.

Gallery

See also
Lords of Westerlo
Jean Philippe Eugène de Mérode
Castle of Westerlo
K.V.C. Westerlo

References

External links

 

Municipalities of Antwerp Province
Populated places in Antwerp Province